The Rebirth of Kirk Franklin is a live album by Kirk Franklin.

The Rebirth of Kirk Franklin is the seventh album released by Kirk Franklin and is his first album to be considered a solo artist. The album was recorded live on June 16, 2000 at Lakewood Church in Houston, Texas. Originally scheduled to be released sometime in mid-June or early July 2001, the album encountered multiple delays primarily due to modifying songs before finally being released on February 19, 2002.

Track listing
Unless otherwise noted, information is taken from Discogs.com

"Throw Yo Hands Up" was featured in the Xbox game Project Gotham Racing under the artist name Souljahz.

Personnel

Vocalists
Note: Members from One Nation Crew are featured in the choir

Faith Anderson, Joy Willis, Dinora Brandon, Shanika Leeks, Daphanie Wright, Joy Hill, Carinia Hill, Myron Butler, Machelle Robinson, Ashley Guilbert, Karla Nivens, Sheila Ingram, LeTitia Calhoun-Smith, Kendra Greene, Hope Jones, Jana Bell, Nathan Young, Krista Norman,  Tierannye Daniels, Tiwanna Phillips, Brandon Kizer, Candy West, Patricia Rangel, Lashonda Watson, Frank Lawson, Heith Guilbert, Douglas Fell, Donald Wright Jr., Cortrinia Holly, Tommy King, Jason Huff, Michael Kimbrow, Demetrius McClendon

Musicians
 Bobby Sparks II: Hammond B-3, Keyboards
 Shaun Martin: Keyboards
 Keith Taylor: Bass
 Lawrence "Peabody" Ferrell: Drums
 Todd Parsnow: Lead Guitar, Acoustic Guitar
 Terry Baker: Drums
 Michael Robinson: Piano
 Rickey “Bongo" Carthen: Percussion
 Mark Baldwin: Electric Guitar, Acoustic Guitar
 David Huntsinger: Piano
 Ernest "Ernie G" Greene: DJ
 Chris McDonald: Trombone
 Vinny Ciesielski: Trumpet
 Quinton Ware: Trumpet
 Doug Moffitt: Tenor Sax
 Jim Horn: Baritone Sax, Alto Sax
 The Nashville Strings: Strings

Chart performance 
The album debuted at No. 4 on the Billboard 200 with first-week sales of 91,000 copies.

Charts

Weekly charts

Year-end charts

Certification 

References

2002 albums
Kirk Franklin albums